Adezai or Addezai (Pashto: آديزئي) is a town in the Peshawar District of Pakistan. The N55 road partly connects it to Peshawar in the north and Kohat via Dara Adam Khel to the south.  there are many kandhi in the village. The best-known are Mughalkhel, mirzakhel, behramkhel, sadarkhel, umarkhel, khwajakhel, and misrikhel.

Landmarks
The town contains mosques such as Bilal Habshi Mosque, Masjid Fateh Khel, and Masjid Mirzakhel. The Adezai Government Higher Secondary School is situated along the main road. Danveer Karan playground is located off the main road in the southeastern part of the town.

References

Populated places in Peshawar District